Notre Dame, French for "Our Lady", a title of Mary, mother of Jesus, most commonly refers to:
 Notre-Dame de Paris, a cathedral in Paris, France
 University of Notre Dame, a university in Indiana, United States
 Notre Dame Fighting Irish, the university's athletics teams

Notre Dame may also refer to:

Churches and cathedrals

Algeria 
 Notre-Dame d'Afrique, Algiers

Cambodia 
 Notre Dame Cathedral (Phnom Penh)

Canada 
 Notre-Dame Basilica (Montreal), in the historic district of Old Montreal
 Notre-Dame Church (Montreal) (1682-1830), historically in Old Montreal
 Notre-Dame Basilica-Cathedral (Quebec City), the primate church of Canada
 Notre-Dame Cathedral Basilica (Ottawa), an ecclesiastic basilica
 Notre-Dame-de-Bon-Secours Chapel, Montreal
 Notre Dame Convent and Boarding School, also known as Leipzig Convent, in Leipzig, Saskatchewan
 Notre-Dame Street in Montreal

France 
 Basilica of Notre-Dame de Fourvière, Lyon

 Cathedral of Notre Dame, Amiens
 Cathédrale Notre-Dame de Bayeux
 Cathédrale Notre-Dame de Chartres
 Cathédrale Notre-Dame de Laon
 Cathédrale Notre-Dame de Rouen
 Cathédrale Notre-Dame-de-Strasbourg
Notre-Dame-de-Bon-Secours Chapel of Dieppe
 Church of Notre-Dame of Dijon
 Chapel of Notre Dame des Anges
 Collegiate Church of Notre-Dame, Melun
 Église Notre Dame de l'Assomption, Metz
 Église Notre-Dame la Grande, Poitiers

 Notre-Dame de la Garde, Marseille
Notre Dame de l'Assomption, les Saintes, Terre-de-Haut
 Notre-Dame de Guebwiller
 Notre-Dame de Nice
 Notre-Dame de Paris
 Notre-Dame de Reims
 Notre Dame des Cyclistes, Labastide-d'Armagnac
 Notre Dame du Haut, Ronchamp
 Church of Notre-Dame, Villeneuve-sur-Yonne

Haiti 
 Cathédrale Notre-Dame de Port-au-Prince, Cathedral of Our Lady of the Assumption

Luxembourg 
 Notre-Dame Cathedral, Luxembourg, the Roman Catholic Cathedral of Luxembourg City

United Kingdom 
 Notre Dame de France, London

United States 
 Basilica of the Sacred Heart, Notre Dame, Indiana
 Church of Notre Dame (New York City), a parish of the Roman Catholic Archdiocese of New York
 Notre Dame de Chicago, Chicago, Illinois

Vietnam 
 Saigon Notre-Dame Basilica, Ho Chi Minh City

Organizations 
 Hospitalité Notre Dame de Lourdes, a Roman Catholic religious confraternity under the spiritual authority of the Bishop of Tarbes and Lourdes
 School Sisters of Notre Dame, a worldwide order of Roman Catholic nuns devoted to education
 Sisters of Notre Dame de Namur, a Roman Catholic order of religious sisters dedicated to providing education to the poor

Places

Canada 
 Notre Dame (electoral district), Manitoba
 Notre-Dame-de-Lourdes, Manitoba
 Notre-Dame, New Brunswick
 Notre-Dame-de-Lourdes, New Brunswick
 Notre Dame Bay, a large bay near the mouth of the Exploits River
 Notre-Dame-Auxiliatrice-de-Buckland, Quebec, Chaudière-Appalaches
 Notre-Dame-de-Bonsecours, Quebec, Outaouais
 Notre-Dame-de-Grâce, neighbourhood in Montreal
 Notre-Dame-de-Ham, Quebec, Centre-du-Québec
 Notre-Dame-de-la-Merci, Quebec, Lanaudière
 Notre-Dame-de-la-Paix, Quebec, Outaouais
 Notre-Dame-de-la-Salette, Quebec, Outaouais
 Notre-Dame-de-l'Île-Perrot, Quebec, Montérégie
 Notre-Dame-de-Lorette, Quebec, Saguenay-Lac-Saint-Jean
 Notre-Dame-de-Lourdes, Centre-du-Québec, Quebec
 Notre-Dame-de-Lourdes, Lanaudière, Quebec
 Notre-Dame-de-Montauban, Quebec, Mauricie
 Notre-Dame-de-Pontmain, Quebec, Laurentides
 Notre-Dame-de-Stanbridge, Quebec, Montérégie
 Notre-Dame-des-Anges, Quebec, Capitale-Nationale
 Notre-Dame-des-Bois, Quebec, Estrie
 Notre-Dame-des-Monts, Quebec, Capitale-Nationale
 Notre-Dame-des-Neiges, Quebec, Bas-Saint-Laurent
 Notre-Dame-des-Pins, Quebec, Chaudière-Appalaches
 Notre-Dame-des-Prairies, Quebec, Lanaudière
 Notre-Dame-des-Sept-Douleurs, Quebec, Bas-Saint-Laurent
 Notre-Dame-du-Lac, Quebec, Bas-Saint-Laurent
 Notre-Dame-du-Laus, Quebec, Laurentides
 Notre-Dame-du-Mont-Carmel, Quebec, Mauricie
 Notre-Dame-du-Mont-Carmel, Lacolle, Quebec, a former parish municipality in Montérégie that is now part of Lacolle, Quebec
 Notre-Dame-du-Nord, Quebec, Abitibi-Témiscamingue
 Notre-Dame-du-Portage, Quebec, Bas-Saint-Laurent
 Notre-Dame-du-Rosaire, Quebec, Chaudière-Appalaches
 Notre-Dame-du-Sacré-Cœur-d'Issoudun, Quebec, Chaudière-Appalaches
 Notre Dame Mountains, part of the Appalachian Mountains

Mauritius 
 Notre Dame, Mauritius, a village in the Pamplemousses District

United States 
 Notre Dame, Indiana, a census-designated place north of South Bend in St. Joseph County

Colleges and universities

Australia 
 University of Notre Dame Australia, Fremantle, Western Australia, Broome, Western Australia, and Sydney, New South Wales
 Notre Dame campus of Emmanuel College, Melbourne

Bangladesh 
 Notre Dame College, Dhaka, a higher secondary degree college affiliated to the National University
 Notre Dame College, Mymensingh, a higher secondary degree college affiliated to the National University
 Notre Dame University Bangladesh, a private university operated by the Congregation of Holy Cross

Belgium 
 Facultés Universitaires Notre-Dame de la Paix, Namur, Belgium

Canada 
Notre Dame University College, Nelson, British Columbia (1950–1984)

Haiti 
 University Notre Dame of Haiti, Port-au-Prince

Japan
 Kyoto Notre Dame University, Sakyo-ku
 Notre Dame Seishin University, Okayama

Lebanon 
 Notre Dame University – Louaize, Zouk Mosbeh

Netherlands 
 Notre Dame des Anges, a secondary school in Ubbergen, Gelderland

Philippines 
 Notre Dame Educational Association, a network of Notre Dame Schools
 Notre Dame of Dadiangas University in General Santos City, South Cotabato
 Notre Dame of Isulan in Isulan, Sultan Kudarat
 Notre Dame of Marbel University in Koronadal City, South Cotabato
 Notre Dame of Midsayap College in Midsayap, North Cotabato
 Notre Dame University (Philippines) in  Cotabato City, Maguindanao
 Notre Dame of Cotabato, Inc. in Cotabato City, Maguindanao
 Notre Dame – RVM College of Cotabato in  Cotabato City, Maguindanao

United States 

 Notre Dame College (New Hampshire), a former college in Manchester, New Hampshire
 Notre Dame College (Staten Island), a former women's college in Staten Island, New York
 Notre Dame College, South Euclid, Ohio 
 Notre Dame de Namur University, Belmont, California
 Notre Dame of Maryland University, Baltimore, Maryland
 University of Notre Dame, Notre Dame, Indiana
 Notre Dame Seminary, Louisiana

Other uses
 Notre Dame (band), a Swedish metal band
 Notre Dame (grape) or Jurançon, a French wine grape
 Notre Dame (opera), a 1906 romantic opera by Franz Schmidt
 Notre-Dame, une fin d'après-midi, a 1902 painting by Henri Matisse
 Notre Dame Catholic Secondary School (Brampton), in Brampton, Ontario, Canada
 Notre Dame school of Polyphony, a group of composers in Paris from about 1170 to 1250
 Notre-Dame Street, a street in Montreal

See also 
 Church of Our Lady (disambiguation)
 ND (disambiguation)
 NDU (disambiguation)
 Notre Dame de Lourdes (disambiguation)
 Notre-Dame de Paris (disambiguation)
 Notre Dame High School (disambiguation)
 Occurrence of religious symbolism in U.S. sports team names and mascots
 Our Lady (disambiguation)